Sophie Ambler  is a medieval historian, focussing on politics, ethics, and warfare, often through the lens of the Crusades. She undertook her PhD at King's College London, supervised by David A. Carpenter. Since 2021, she has been Reader in Central & Later Medieval History at Lancaster University, and before that was Lecturer since 2017. Earlier in her career, Ambler worked at the University of East Anglia. In 2020, Ambler was one of the recipients of the Philip Leverhulme Prize. Ambler frequently contributes to TV and radio, like her piece on the Second Barons' War as part of In Our Time.

Selected works 
Books

References

External links 

 
 

Medievalists
Women medievalists
Academics of the University of East Anglia
Academics of Lancaster University
Alumni of King's College London
Year of birth missing (living people)
Living people